Chunhua County is a county under the administration of the prefecture-level city of Xianyang, in the central part of Shaanxi province, China.

Administrative divisions
As 2016, this County is divided to 12 towns.
Towns

Climate

Transportation
China National Highway 211

References

County-level divisions of Shaanxi
Xianyang